Kintaq, or Kentaq Bong, is an Austroasiatic language spoken in Malaysia and Thailand. It belongs to the Northern Aslian sub-branch of the Aslian languages. The small number of speakers is decreasing.

References

External links 
 http://projekt.ht.lu.se/rwaai RWAAI (Repository and Workspace for Austroasiatic Intangible Heritage)
 http://hdl.handle.net/10050/00-0000-0000-0003-EBC8-D@view Kintaq in RWAAI Digital Archive

Languages of Malaysia
Languages of Thailand
Aslian languages